The 1980 Tour de Suisse was the 44th edition of the Tour de Suisse cycle race and was held from 11 June to 20 June 1980. The race started in Rheinfelden and finished in Zürich. The race was won by Mario Beccia of the Hoonved–Bottecchia team.

General classification

References

1980
Tour de Suisse
1980 Super Prestige Pernod